Joseph McCormick may refer to:

 Joseph McCormick (minister) (1733–1799), Moderator of the General Assembly of the Church of Scotland in 1782, joint founder of the Royal Society of Edinburgh, a Principal at St Andrews University
 Joseph B. McCormick, chief at the Centers for Disease Control and Prevention
 J. Carroll McCormick (1907–1996), Roman Catholic bishop
 Joseph F. McCormick (born 1962), American politician, businessman, political activist
 Joseph H. McCormick, American football coach
 Joseph Medill McCormick (1877–1925), U.S. Representative and Senator from Illinois
 Joseph McCormick (cricketer) (1834–1914), English amateur cricketer
 Joseph McCormick (ice hockey) (1894–1958), Canadian, and later American, ice hockey player
 Joseph McCormick (politician and soldier) (1787–1875), American politician in Indiana and Wisconsin
 Joseph McCormick (Ohio lawyer) (1814–1879), second Attorney General of Ohio
 Joseph Gough McCormick (1874–1924), Dean of Manchester

See also
 McCormick (surname)